Prothemenops is a genus of Southeast Asian armored trapdoor spiders that was first described by Peter J. Schwendinger in 1991.

Species
 it contains four species from Thailand, and at least a dozen more suspected species found in Thailand, Laos, and Cambodia:
Prothemenops irineae Schwendinger & Hongpadharakiree, 2014 – Thailand
Prothemenops khirikhan Schwendinger & Hongpadharakiree, 2014 – Thailand
Prothemenops phanthurat Schwendinger & Hongpadharakiree, 2014 – Thailand
Prothemenops siamensis Schwendinger, 1991 (type) – Thailand

See also
 List of Idiopidae species

References

Arthropods of Thailand
Idiopidae
Mygalomorphae genera
Spiders of Asia